Ajayan, also known as Thoppil Ajayan, (8 April 1950 – 13 December 2018) was a Malayalam film director who is of note for his only feature film Perumthachan (The Master Carpenter).  The film received positive reviews from critics worldwide. For this film, Ajayan won the Indira Gandhi Award for Best Debut Film of a Director and Kerala State Film Award for Best Debut Director in 1990.  The film also won the Kerala State Film Award for Best Popular Film in 1990 and was nominated for the Golden Leopard award at the Locarno International Film Festival in 1992.

In the afterword to his book The Master Carpenter, author M. T. Vasudevan Nair wrote that Ajayan first approached him for a screenplay of his story Manikkakkallu.  That did not materialise and later he approached with another dream project Perumthachan. In the end of the afterword, M. T. thanks Ajayan for persuading him to write the screenplay for Perumthachan.

He died on 13 December 2018.

Early life and career
Ajayan was the eldest son of film director and playwright Thoppil Bhasi.  He secured a diploma in film technology from the Adayar film institute. He started as a camera assistant and later worked as an associate director with Thoppil Bhasi, Bharathan, and Padmarajan.

Filmography

Director

Assistant Director

Chief Associate Director

Associate Director

Awards

National Film Awards
1990: Indira Gandhi Award for Best Debut Film of a Director - Perumthachan

Kerala State Film Award
1990: Kerala State Film Award for Best Film with Popular Appeal and Aesthetic Value - Perumthachan
1990: Kerala State Film Award for Best Debut Director

References

External links
 
 'Cinema of Malayalam' profile

1950 births
2018 deaths
Film directors from Kerala
Kerala State Film Award winners
Malayalam film directors
M.G.R. Government Film and Television Training Institute alumni
People from Alappuzha district
20th-century Indian film directors
Director whose film won the Best Debut Feature Film National Film Award